Michelle Belanger is an American author who has authored over two dozen nonfiction books on paranormal and occult topics, has appeared in television documentaries about magic and modern occultism. She has performed as a vocalist and worked as a writer with Nox Arcana.

Biography 
Belanger is the founder of the magical group House Kheperu. Belanger has appeared as a psychic on A&E's Paranormal State and Osbourne Media's Portals to Hell. She has consulted for numerous documentaries, books, and courses. Belanger was a National Merit Scholar. Belanger has also contributed to Marvel AR, HBO's True Blood, CNN Headline News, CSI and Nox Arcana.</ref>

Media 
She also gives talks on the student campus network, and has appeared in a number of television shows and films about vampires in myth, history, and the modern day. Belanger has appeared on the radio show, Coast to Coast AM.

Filmography 
 Night Bites: Women and Their Vampires (TV Movie 28 May 2003)
 The Secret Life of Vampires (A&E, 2005)
 Vampire Secrets (History Channel, 2006) 
 Vampyres (Documentary, 30 August 2007 (Canada))
 Hannity's America: "Night Neighbors" (Fox News, 2011) 
 Paranormal State (A&E)
 True Blood-Lines: A New Type (TV Short documentary, 2008)
MonsterQuest: Vampires in America  (Episode aired 6 August 2008; Season 2, Episode 11)
Paranormal Lockdown: Monroe House (TLC, 2016)
 Jack Osbourne and Katrina Weidman's Portals to Hell (Travel Channel, 2019, 2020, 2021)

Music 
Belanger has performed with Nox Arcana. She was a guest vocalist on Nox Arcana's album Winter's Knight (2005) which ranked #8 on the Billboard chart for Top Holiday Albums. Belanger also wrote the songs for the Nox Arcana's album, Blood of Angels (2006).

Literature 
Michelle Belanger has authored over two dozen books on the occult and paranormal experiences. Some of Belanger's written work include:

Bibliography

Nonfiction
 The Psychic Vampire Codex (July 2004, Weiser Books)
 Sacred Hunger (October 2005, Dark Moon Press)
 Soul Songs from Distant Shores (October 2005, Emerald Tablet Designs)
 Psychic Dreamwalking (October 2006, Weiser Books)
 The Psychic Energy Codex (July 2007, Weiser Books)
 Vampires in Their Own Words: An Anthology of Vampire Voices (September 2007, Llewellyn Publications)
 The Vampire Ritual Book (October 2007, self published)
 This Ritual of Me (December 2007, Emerald Tablet Productions)
 Walking the Twilight Path (October 2008, Llewellyn Publications)
 The Ghost Hunter's Survival Guide (October 2009, Llewellyn Publications)
 Haunting Experiences (April 2009, Llewellyn Publications)
 Chasing Infinity (July 2010, Emerald Tablet Press)
 The Dictionary of Demons: Names of the Damned (October 2010, Llewellyn Publications)
 D is for Demon (December 2010, self published)
 House Kheperu Archives: The Outer Teachings of House Kheperu (February 2011, Emerald Tablet Press)
 The Watcher Angel Tarot Guidebook (October 2011, Emerald Tablet Press)
 Sumerian Exorcism: Magick, Demons, and the Lost Art of Marduk (February 2013, Dark Moon Press)
 The Ghost Hunter's Guide to the Occult (July 2013, Dark Moon Press)
 Summoning Spirits: The Heptameron of Peter de Abano (February 2016, Dark Moon Press)
 Wide World of Weird (December 2019, Inspiration Press)
 A Winding Path of Words (January 2020, Emerald Tablet Press)

Fiction
 Wicked Kisses (2008, self published)
 This Heart of Flame (November 2009, StoneGarden.net)
 When Millie Comes Back (February 2015, Emerald Tablet Productions)
 These Haunted Dreams (collection) (March 2015, Dark Moon Press)
 One For The Ferryman (February 2016, Dark Moon Press)
 Fairy Tales for the Disenchanted (January 2020, e-book only)

The Shadowside
 Conspiracy of Angels (October 2015, Titan Books)
 Harsh Gods (August 2016, Titan Books)
 The Resurrection Game (November 2017, Titan Books)

In addition to the main series novels, the following novella was released in ebook only:
 Mortal Sins (October 2016, Titan Books)

References

External links
Official website
Amazon Author Page

1973 births
American occult writers
American occultists
American spiritual writers
Living people
Paranormal investigators
Writers from Ohio
Vampirism
American women non-fiction writers
21st-century American women singers